The Central District of Aligudarz County is a district (bakhsh) in Aligudarz County, Lorestan Province, Iran. At the 2006 census, its population was 113,455, in 25,013 families.  The District has one city: Aligudarz.

References 

Districts of Lorestan Province
Aligudarz County